Mauro Javier Cardenas is an Ecuadorian writer. He grew up in Guayaquil and studied economics at Stanford University. His debut novel The Revolutionaries Try Again was published in 2016. Also that year, he received a Joseph Henry Jackson Award. In 2017, he was named as one of the Bogota39, a selection of the best young writers in Latin America. His second novel, Aphasia, was published in 2020.

References

Ecuadorian writers
Year of birth missing (living people)
Living people